The flag of the state of Wyoming consists of the silhouette of an American bison. The red symbolizes the Native Americans and the blood of pioneers who gave their lives. The white is a symbol of purity and uprightness. The blue is the color of the skies and distant mountains. It is also a symbol of fidelity, justice and virility. The bison represents the local fauna, while the seal on it suggests the custom of branding livestock.

History

In 1916 the Wyoming Daughters of the American Revolution (DAR) ran a contest inviting the public to submit possible designs for a Wyoming flag. A prize of $20 was offered to the winner, and the DAR received a total of 37 entries. They chose a drawing by Verna Keays, a recent graduate of the Art Institute of Chicago. On January 31, 1917, Governor Robert D. Carey signed the state flag bill into law and the bison flag was officially adopted.

DAR regent Grace Raymond Hebard, a professor at the University of Wyoming, suffragist and scholar, contributed suggestions for changes after the design had been accepted. In Keays' original design, the one approved by Wyoming's legislature, the bison faces toward the fly, symbolizing its former freedom to roam the plains of Wyoming. Hebard thought that if the bison were to face toward the hoist, the design would be more balanced (animals generally face the hoist on flags, as they would the wind). In the end, all Wyoming flags from the first batch produced onward showed the bison facing the hoist, although this change was never officially adopted by the Wyoming legislature.

Vice President Dick Cheney, a former resident of and congressman from Wyoming, displayed the flag in his White House office.

References

External links

United States state flags
Flag
Bison in art
1917 establishments in Wyoming
Wyoming
Daughters of the American Revolution
Flags adopted through competition